Brush Creek is a stream in Faribault County, in the U.S. state of Minnesota. Brush Creek was named for the dense brush along its banks.

See also
List of rivers of Minnesota

References

Rivers of Faribault County, Minnesota
Rivers of Minnesota